Angel Oak is a Southern live oak (Quercus virginiana) located in Angel Oak Park on Johns Island near Charleston, South Carolina. The tree is estimated to be 400–500 years old. It stands 66.5 ft  (20 m) tall, measures 28 ft (8.5 m) in circumference, and produces shade that covers 17,200 square feet (1,600 m2). Its longest branch distance is 187 ft in length. Angel Oak was the 210th tree to be registered with the Live Oak Society.

Background

The oak derives its name from the estate of Justus Angel and his wife, Martha Waight Tucker Angel. Local folklore tells stories of ghosts of former enslaved people appearing as angels around the tree.

Despite the claims that the Angel Oak is the oldest tree east of the Mississippi River, bald cypress trees throughout North and South Carolina are significantly older.  One example in North Carolina is over 1,600 years old.

History

Angel Oak was damaged severely during Hurricane Hugo in 1989 but has since recovered. The City of Charleston has owned the tree and surrounding park since 1991.

Development is beginning to encroach on the site of Angel Oak. In 2012, plans to build a 500-unit apartment complex that would be  from Angel Oak were challenged in court by a group called Save the Angel Oak and the Coastal Conservation League; their concerns included the construction's effect on available groundwater and nutrients. By December, 2013, the Lowcountry Land Trust, celebrated  "the preservation of 17 acres adjacent to the majestic tree." The 17 acres adjacent to the Angel Oak were purchased by Lowcountry Land Trust, protecting the area from development.

The Angel Oak features prominently in the book The Heart of A Child by Emily Nelson.

The Angel Oak was the focal point of an Allstate television ad in September 2018 saluting the strength of the Carolinas following the devastation of Hurricane Florence.

See also
 List of individual trees

References
Notes

Sources

Individual oak trees
Protected areas of Charleston County, South Carolina
Trees of the Southeastern United States
Natural history of South Carolina
Individual trees in the United States
Landmarks in South Carolina